Virbia zonata is a moth in the family Erebidae first described by Felder and Rogenhofer in 1874. It is found in Mexico.

References

zonata
Moths described in 1874